Dumbarton F.C. are a Scottish professional association football club based in Dumbarton, who currently play in the Scottish League 1. They have played at their current home ground, the C&G Systems Stadium, since 2000. Previous to this they played at Boghead Park from 1879 until 2000 and various grounds in Dumbarton from their foundation in 1872 to 1879. They were one of the founding clubs of the Scottish Football League in 1890, and since that time the club's first team has competed in numerous nationally and internationally organised competitions.

All players who have played in 100 or more such matches or played international or representative football during their time at the club are listed below. Players are listed according to the date of their first professional contract signed with the club. Appearances and goals are for first-team competitive matches only, substitute appearances are included.  Wartime appearances are listed separately as they are considered to be 'unofficial'.

List of players

Club

Wartime

International

Senior

League XI

Under-23

Under-21

Under-19

B League

Semi-Pro

Amateur

Wartime

Representative

Scotch Counties

Dumbartonshire

West of Scotland

Scottish Internationalists

Scottish Anglos

SFA (Wartime)

References

 
Players
Dumbarton
Association football player non-biographical articles
Players